Wotanism may refer to:

 Wotanism (Guido von List)—an esoteric ideological precursor pioneered by Guido von List
 Wotansvolk, the neo-völkisch mystery tradition promulgated by David Eden Lane through 14 Word Press
 A racial form of Heathenry (Odinism)

See also 
 Wodenism, Anglo-Saxon paganism
 Wotan (disambiguation)
 Odinism (disambiguation)